Evi Strasser (born 13 February 1964) is a Canadian equestrian. She competed in two events at the 1996 Summer Olympics.

References

External links
 

1964 births
Living people
Canadian female equestrians
Canadian dressage riders
Olympic equestrians of Canada
Equestrians at the 1996 Summer Olympics
Equestrians at the 2003 Pan American Games
Pan American Games medalists in equestrian
Pan American Games silver medalists for Canada
People from Traunstein (district)
Sportspeople from Upper Bavaria
Medalists at the 2003 Pan American Games
German emigrants to Canada
20th-century Canadian women
21st-century Canadian women